Eddy W M Lai (born 12 December 1973) is horse racing jockey. He has been riding in Hong Kong for 19 years. In 2010/11 he rode 14 winners to bring his career total to 245.
 In the 2013/14 season, he rode another 10 winners to bring his career total to 282.

Major Wins
HKG1 Hong Kong Classic Mile - Self Flit (2003)
HSBC Premier Bowl (HK Gr.3) - Absolute Champion (2006)
HKG3 Premier Plate - Sapelli (2011)

Performance

References

The Hong Kong Jockey Club

Hong Kong jockeys
Living people
1973 births